"I Knew It All the Time" is a song written by Mitch Murray and recorded by The Dave Clark Five; it was originally released in 1962 in the UK as the B-side of (Pye subsidiary) Piccadilly 7N 35500 and in the US on Kapp’s Congress label in 1964 The song was recorded in 1962 and is essentially a rewrite of “Wimoweh”  Billboard said of the song that "this is a hit different sound from Clark entries on
Epic but its got the hard rock sound growling vocal against stomping beat."  Cash Box described it as "an intriguing, gospel-flavored jumper with exciting percussive bits."

Chart performance
In the US, "I Knew It All the Time" peaked at #54 on the Billboard Pop Singles chart.

References

1964 singles
The Dave Clark Five songs
Songs written by Mitch Murray
1964 songs